Altos de Chavón is a tourist attraction, a re-creation of a 16th century Mediterranean–style village, located atop the Chavón River in the city of La Romana, Dominican Republic. It is the most popular attraction in the city and hosts a cultural center, an archeological museum, and an amphitheater. The project was conceived by the Italian architect Roberto Copa, and the industrialist Charles Bluhdorn.

History

The project began in 1976 when the construction of a nearby road and bridge crossing the Chavón River had to be blasted through a mountain of stone. Charles Bludhorn, chairman of Paramount then parent Gulf+Western, had the idea of using the stones to re-create a sixteenth-century style Mediterranean village, similar to some of the architecture found in the historic center of Santo Domingo. Construction was completed in the early 1980s. Charles Bluhdorn's daughter, Dominique Bluhdorn, is the current president of the Altos de Chavón Cultural Center Foundation. 

Narrow, cobble-covered alleyways lined with lanterns and shuttered limestone walls yield several good Mediterranean-style restaurants, a number of quaint shops featuring the diverse craftwork of local artisans, and three galleries exhibiting the talents of local students.

Altos de Chavón School of Design 
The on-site design school, Altos de Chavón School of Design (Spanish: Altos de Chavón La Escuela de Diseño) was founded in 1983. It is an affiliate school of Parsons School of Design in New York City. Notable attendees of the Altos de Chavón Design School have included Lisa Thon, Joiri Minaya, and Mía Lourdes Taveras López.

St. Stanislaus Church 
Adding authenticity to the project is the St. Stanislaus Church (Iglesia San Estanislao de Cracovia in Spanish). With its plaza and sparkling fountain, it is a popular wedding venue. The St. Stanislaus Church was named after the patron saint of Poland, Stanislaus of Szczepanów in tribute to Pope John Paul II who visited Santo Domingo in 1979 and left some of the saint's ashes behind. It was in this church that Louis Alphonse, Duke of Anjou married Venezuelan heiress Maria Margarita de Vargas y Santaella on November 6, 2004.

Amphitheater 
A Roman-styled 5,000-seat amphitheater hosts 20th century musical acts—The Pet Shop Boys, Frank Sinatra, and Julio Iglesias to name a few—while Génesis nightclub provides a popular dance venue for guests from the Casa de Campo resort nearby.  The Regional Museum of Archaeology (El Museo Arqueológico Regional) contains a collection of pre-Columbian Indian artifacts unearthed in the surrounding area.  Altos de Chavón overlooks Rio Chavón and the Dye Fore golf course of Casa de Campo; both built by former Gulf+Western chairman Charles Bluhdorn.

The Concert for the Americas was held here in August 1982. Performers included Frank Sinatra, Buddy Rich, Heart and Santana.

See also
 Casa de Campo
 List of contemporary amphitheaters

References

External links

 The Altos de Chavón Cultural Center Foundation
 Karma video by Alicia Keys
 Kandela - a show at the Altos de Chavón amphitheater

Buildings and structures in La Romana Province
Music venues in the Dominican Republic
1976 establishments in the Dominican Republic
Gulf and Western Industries
Tourist attractions in La Romana Province